Victoria Park is the oldest park in Kitchener, Ontario, Canada, situated downtown. It is the site of numerous events and festivities.

A Berlin (Kitchener) map from 1879 has a Town Park, located between Mill Street and Highland Road where Highland Courts and Woodside Parks stand today. It sits on the original Joseph E. Schneider homestead; the municipal government had purchased some acres from the family in 1895 and drained the swamp on the land. The 27 acre purchase was initially opposed by some parties for being too far outside of town. The park opened on 27 August 1896; the lake, bridges and three islands were in place at that time.

The Park was named after Queen Victoria ahead of her diamond jubilee on the British throne. The human-made lake is fed by Schneider Creek, surrounds three small islands, and is crossed by multiple bridges. The park also contains the Victoria Park pavilion, the Victoria Park Gallery and Archives, a bandstand, and a historic boathouse, a pub and music venue. A pavilion was first introduced to the park in 1902 as a response to complaints that there was nowhere to seek shelter when it started to rain. Designed by Charles Knechtel, the structure was set on fire in 1916 and deemed too damaged to recover. A second pavilion, borrowing heavily from Knechtel's original design, was built in 1924. Situated on the same spot as the original, the front of the pavilion faces the water, whereas the original faced the park's main island.

The Gaukel street entrance features a clock tower which was once atop the old Kitchener City Hall (from 1924 and now site of Market Square Shopping Centre), and before that, the town's fire hall. It was moved to the park entrance and complemented with a fountain and a sculpture of luggage, by local artist Ernest Daetwyler, symbolizing the various waves of immigration that have contributed the city's history.

A cast-bronze statue of Queen Victoria by Cavaliere Raffaele Zaccaquini and a cannon are situated in the park. The statue was unveiled in May 1911, on Victoria Day on the ten year anniversary of her death. The Princess of Wales Chapter of the IODE raised the $6,000 needed for the monument.

In 1897 a large bronze bust of Kaiser Wilhelm I, made by Reinhold Begas and shipped from Germany, was installed at in the park to honour the region's prominent German-Canadian population. It was removed and thrown into the lake by vandals in August 1914 at the beginning of the First World War. The bust was recovered from the lake and moved to the nearby Concordia club, but it was stolen again February 15, 1916, marched through the streets by a mob, made up largely of soldiers from the 118th Battalion, and has never been seen again. The 118th Battalion is rumoured to have melted down the bust to make napkin rings given to its members. A monument with a plaque outlining the story of the original bust was erected in the park in 1996.

In the fall of 2011, $10.1-million of restoration work on the park's lake was started, and in all 85,000 tonnes of sediment were removed from the lake bottom. Thousands of concrete and stone blocks were placed along the 2.2 kilometres of shoreline as a retaining wall to prevent erosion. While the overall area of the lake was slightly reduced, the waterway near the mouth of Schneider's creek at the north end of the park was widened to create a "fore bay" which slows the flow of water and allows sediment to settle in one place for easy removal.

A major renovation was completed on the Boathouse in 2014. The building had originally been used to store canoes in summer and as a changing room for skaters, but also included a tea house for some years. It was closed between September 2013 and January 2015, and re-opened as a restaurant with indoor and outdoor seating, operated by Mark Forwell, The business closed down in October 2019; the owner was leasing the building from the City of Kitchener and exercised an exit option in the lease.

The city announced in late 2019 that its budget includes $3 million for Victoria Park, to be used over 2021–2023 to achieve the results discussed in the master plan. While no single new element will be significant, the funds will allow for a renewal of the existing facilities including the trees.

Victoria Park is home to Victoria Parkrun, Kitchener, a free 5K held every Saturday morning.

As of 2022, various anti-colonialism interests have raised objections to the park continuing to carry the effigy and name of Queen Victoria; the statue has been vandalized, often with red paint; and formal requests for a rename have been submitted, with the suggestion of Willow River Park as one with Aboriginal roots.

See also
 Victoria Park station
 Schneider Haus

References

External links
 

Kitchener, Ontario
Parks in the Regional Municipality of Waterloo